Electronic Arts Inc. (EA) is an American video game company headquartered in Redwood City, California. Founded in May 1982 by Apple employee Trip Hawkins, the company was a pioneer of the early home computer game industry and promoted the designers and programmers responsible for its games as "software artists." EA published numerous games and some productivity software for personal computers, all of which were developed by external individuals or groups until 1987's Skate or Die!. The company shifted toward internal game studios, often through acquisitions, such as Distinctive Software becoming EA Canada in 1991.

Currently, EA develops and publishes games of established franchises, including Battlefield, Need for Speed, The Sims, Medal of Honor, Command & Conquer, Dead Space, Mass Effect, Dragon Age, Army of Two, Apex Legends, and Star Wars, as well as the EA Sports titles FIFA, Madden NFL, NBA Live, NHL, and EA Sports UFC. Their desktop titles appear on self-developed Origin, an online gaming digital distribution platform for PCs and a direct competitor to Valve's Steam and Epic Games' Store. EA also owns and operates major gaming studios such as EA Tiburon in Orlando, EA Vancouver in Burnaby, EA Romania in Bucharest, DICE in Stockholm, Motive Studio in Montreal, BioWare in Edmonton and Austin, and Respawn Entertainment in Los Angeles and Vancouver.

History

1982–1991: Trip Hawkins era, founding, and early success

Trip Hawkins had been an employee of Apple since 1978, at a time when the company had only about fifty employees. Over the next four years, the market for home personal computers skyrocketed. By 1982, Apple had completed its initial public offering (IPO) and become a Fortune 500 company with over one thousand employees.

In February 1982, Trip Hawkins arranged a meeting with Don Valentine of Sequoia Capital to discuss financing his new venture, Amazin' Software. Valentine encouraged Hawkins to leave Apple, where Hawkins served as Director of Product Marketing, and allowed Hawkins use of Sequoia Capital's spare office space to start the company. On May 27, 1982, Trip Hawkins incorporated and established the company with a personal investment of an estimated .

For more than seven months, Hawkins refined his Electronic Arts business plan. With aid from his first employee (with whom he worked in marketing at Apple), Rich Melmon, the original plan was written, mostly by Hawkins, on an Apple II in Sequoia Capital's office in August 1982. During that time, Hawkins also employed two of his former staff from Apple, Dave Evans and Pat Marriott, as producers, and a Stanford MBA classmate, Jeff Burton from Atari for international business development. The business plan was again refined in September and reissued on October 8, 1982. By November, the employee headcount rose to 11, including Tim Mott, Bing Gordon, David Maynard, and Steve Hayes. Having outgrown the office space provided by Sequoia Capital, the company relocated to a San Mateo office that overlooked the San Francisco Airport landing path. Headcount rose rapidly in 1983, including Don Daglow and Richard Hilleman.

When he incorporated the company, Hawkins originally chose Amazin' Software as their company name, but his other early employees of the company universally disliked the name and it changed its name to Electronic Arts in November 1982. He scheduled an off-site meeting in the Pajaro Dunes, where the company once held such off-site meetings. Hawkins had developed the ideas of treating software as an art form and calling the developers, "software artists". Hence, the latest version of the business plan had suggested the name "SoftArt". However, Hawkins and Melmon knew the founders of Software Arts, the creators of VisiCalc, and thought their permission should be obtained. Dan Bricklin did not want the name used because it sounded too similar (perhaps "confusingly similar") to Software Arts. However, the name concept was liked by all the attendees. Hawkins had also recently read a bestselling book about the film studio United Artists, and liked the reputation that the company had created. Hawkins said everyone had a vote but they would lose it if they went to sleep.

Hawkins liked the word "electronic", and various employees had considered the phrases "Electronic Artists" and "Electronic Arts". When Gordon and others pushed for "Electronic Artists", in tribute to the film company United Artists, Steve Hayes opposed, saying, "We're not the artists, they [the developers] are..." This statement from Hayes immediately tilted sentiment towards Electronic Arts and the name was unanimously endorsed and adopted later in 1982. He recruited his original employees from Apple, Atari, Xerox PARC, and VisiCorp, and got Steve Wozniak to agree to sit on the board of directors. Hawkins was determined to sell directly to buyers. Combined with the fact that Hawkins was pioneering new game brands, this made sales growth more challenging. Retailers wanted to buy known brands from existing distribution partners. Former CEO Larry Probst arrived as VP of Sales in late 1984 and helped expand the already successful company. This policy of dealing directly with retailers gave EA higher margins and better market awareness, key advantages the company leveraged to leapfrog its early competitors.

Promoting its developers was a trademark of EA's early days.  Games were sold in square packages modeled after album covers (such as those for 1983's M.U.L.E. and Pinball Construction Set). Hawkins thought the packaging would both save costs and convey an artistic feeling. EA routinely referred to their developers as "artists" and gave them photo credits in their games and full-page magazine ads. Their first such ad, accompanied by the slogan "We see farther," was the first video game advertisement to feature software designers. EA shared lavish profits with their developers, which added to their industry appeal.

In the mid-1980s, Electronic Arts aggressively marketed products for the Amiga, a home computer introduced in 1985. Commodore had given EA development tools and prototype machines before Amiga's actual launch. For Amiga EA published some notable non-game titles. A drawing program Deluxe Paint (1985) and its subsequent versions became perhaps the most famous piece of software available for Amiga platform. In addition, EA's Jerry Morrison conceived the idea of a file format that could store images, animations, sounds, and documents simultaneously, and would be compatible with third-party software. He wrote and released to the public the Interchange File Format, which soon became an Amiga standard. Other Amiga programs released by EA included Deluxe Music Construction Set, Instant Music and Deluxe Paint Animation. Some of them, most notably Deluxe Paint, were ported to other platforms. For Macintosh EA released a black & white animation tool called Studio/1, and a series of Paint titles called Studio/8 and Studio/32 (1990).

Relationships between Electronic Arts and their external developers often became difficult when the latter missed deadlines or diverged from the former's creative directions. In 1987, EA released Skate or Die!, their first internally developed game. EA continued publishing their external developers' games while experimenting with their internal development strategy. This led to EA's decision of purchasing out a series of companies they identify as successful, as well as the decision to release annualized franchises to cut budget costs. Because of Trip Hawkins' obsession of simulating a sports game, he signed a contract with football coach John Madden that led to EA's developing and releasing annual Madden NFL games.

In 1988, EA published a flight simulator game exclusively for Amiga, F/A-18 Interceptor, with filled-polygon graphics that were advanced for the time. Another significant Amiga release (also initially available for Atari ST, later converted for other platforms) was Populous (1989) developed by Bullfrog Productions. It was a pioneering title in the genre that was later called "god games". In 1990, Electronic Arts began producing console games for the Nintendo Entertainment System, after previously licensing its computer games to other console-game publishers.

1991–2007: Larry Probst era, continuous expansion, and success into the new millennium
In 1991, Trip Hawkins stepped down as EA's CEO and was succeeded by Larry Probst. Hawkins went on to found the now-defunct 3DO Company, but still remained EA's chair until July 1994. In October 1993, 3DO developed the 3DO Interactive Multiplayer, which at the time was the most powerful game console. Once a critic of game consoles, Hawkins had conceived a console that unlike its competitors would not require a first-party license to be marketed, and was intended to appeal to the PC market. Electronic Arts was The 3DO Company's primary partner in sponsoring their console, showcasing on it their latest games. With a retail price of US$700 compared to its competitors' $100, the console lagged in sales, and with the 1995 arrival to North America of Sony's PlayStation, a cheaper and more powerful alternative, combined with a lower quality of the 3DO's software library as a backfiring of its liberal license policy, it fell further behind and lost competition. Electronic Arts dropped its support for 3DO in favor of the PlayStation, 3DO's production ceased in 1996 and, for the remainder of the company's lifetime, 3DO developed video games for other consoles and the IBM PC until it folded in 2003.

In 1995, Electronic Arts won the European Computer Trade Show award for best software publisher of the year. As the company was still expanding, they opted to purchase space in Redwood Shores, California in 1995 for construction of a new headquarters, which was completed in 1998. Early in 1997, Next Generation identified Electronic Arts as the only company to regularly profit from video games over the past five years, and noted it had "a critical track record second to none".

In 1999, EA replaced their long-running Shapes logo with one based on the EA Sports logo used at the time. EA also started to use a brand-specific structure around this time, with the main publishing side of the company rebranding to EA Games. The EA Sports brand was retained for major sports titles, the new EA Sports Big label would be used for casual sports titles with an arcade twist, and the full Electronic Arts name would be used for co-published and distributed titles.

EA began to move toward direct distribution of digital games and services with the acquisition of the popular online gaming site Pogo.com in 2001. In 2009, EA acquired the London-based social gaming startup Playfish.

In 2004, EA made a multimillion-dollar donation to fund the development of game production curriculum at the University of Southern California's Interactive Media Division. On February 1, 2006, Electronic Arts announced that it would cut worldwide staff by 5 percent. On June 20, 2006, EA purchased Mythic Entertainment, who are finished making Warhammer Online.

After Sega's ESPN NFL 2K5 successfully grabbed market share away from EA's dominant Madden NFL series during the 2004 holiday season, EA responded by making several large sports licensing deals which include an exclusive agreement with the NFL, and in January 2005, a 15-year deal with ESPN. The ESPN deal gave EA exclusive first rights to all ESPN content for sports simulation games. On April 11, 2005, EA announced a similar, 6-year licensing deal with the Collegiate Licensing Company (CLC) for exclusive rights to college football content.

Much of EA's success, both in terms of sales and with regards to its stock market valuation, is due to its strategy of platform-agnostic development and the creation of strong multi-year franchises. EA was the first publisher to release yearly updates of its sports franchises—Madden, FIFA, NHL, NBA Live, Tiger Woods, etc.—with updated player rosters and small graphical and gameplay tweaks. Recognizing the risk of franchise fatigue among consumers, EA announced in 2006 that it would concentrate more of its effort on creating new original intellectual property.

In September 2006, Nokia and EA announced a partnership in which EA becomes an exclusive major supplier of mobile games to Nokia mobile devices through the Nokia Content Discoverer. In the beginning, Nokia customers were able to download seven EA titles (Tetris, Tetris Mania, The Sims 2, Doom, FIFA 06, Tiger Woods PGA Tour 06 and FIFA Street 2) on the holiday season in 2006. Rick Simonson is the executive vice-president and director of Nokia and starting from 2006 is affiliated with John Riccitiello and are partners.

2007–2013: John Riccitiello era
In February 2007, Probst stepped down from the CEO job while remaining on the board of directors. His handpicked successor is John Riccitiello, who had worked at EA for several years previously, departed for a while, and then returned. Riccitiello previously worked for Elevation Partners, Sara Lee and PepsiCo. In June 2007, new CEO John Riccitiello announced that EA would reorganize itself into four labels, each with responsibility for its own product development and publishing (the city-state model). The goal of the reorganization was to empower the labels to operate more autonomously, streamline decision-making, increase creativity and quality, and get games into the market faster. This reorganization came after years of consolidation and acquisition by EA of smaller studios, which some in the industry blamed for a decrease in quality of EA titles. In 2008, at the DICE Summit, Riccitiello called the earlier approach of "buy and assimilate" a mistake, often stripping smaller studios of its creative talent. Riccitiello said that the city-state model allows independent developers to remain autonomous to a large extent, and cited Maxis and BioWare as examples of studios thriving under the new structure.

Also, in 2007, EA announced that it would be bringing some of its major titles to the Mac. EA has released Battlefield 2142, Command & Conquer 3: Tiberium Wars, Crysis, Harry Potter and the Order of the Phoenix, Madden NFL 08, Need for Speed: Carbon and Spore for the Mac. All of the new games have been developed for the Macintosh using Cider, a technology developed by TransGaming that enables Intel-based Macs to run Windows games inside a translation layer running on Mac OS X. They are not playable on PowerPC-based Macs.

It was revealed in February 2008 that Electronic Arts had made a takeover bid for rival game company Take-Two Interactive. Rumours had been floating around the Internet prior to the offer about Take-Two possibly being bought over by a bigger company, albeit with Viacom as the potential bidder. In May 2008, EA announced that it will purchase the assets of Hands-On Mobile Korea, a South Korean mobile game developer and publisher. The company will become EA Mobile Korea. In September 2008, EA dropped its buyout offer of Take-Two. No reason was given.

As of November 6, 2008, it was confirmed that Electronic Arts is closing their Casual Label & merging it with their Hasbro partnership with The Sims Label. EA also confirmed the departure of Kathy Vrabeck, who was given the position as former president of the EA Casual Division in May 2007. EA made this statement about the merger: "We've learned a lot about casual entertainment in the past two years, and found that casual gaming defies a single genre and demographic. With the retirement and departure of Kathy Vrabeck, EA is reorganizing to integrate casual games—development and marketing—into other divisions of our business. We are merging our Casual Studios, Hasbro partnership, and Casual marketing organization with The Sims Label to be a new Sims and Casual Label, where there is a deep compatibility in the product design, marketing and demographics. [...] In the days and weeks ahead, we will make further announcements on the reporting structure for the other businesses in the Casual Label including EA Mobile, Pogo, Media Sales and Online Casual Initiatives. Those businesses remain growth priorities for EA and deserve strong support in a group that will complement their objectives." This statement comes a week after EA announced it was laying off 6% about 600 of their staff positions and had a  net loss for the quarter.

Due to the 2008 economic crisis, Electronic Arts had a poorer than expected 2008 holiday season, moving it in February 2009 to cut approximately 1100 jobs, which it said represented about 11% of its workforce. It also closed 12 of their facilities. Riccitiello, in a conference call with reporters, stated that their poor performance in the fourth quarter was not due entirely to the poor economy, but also to the fact that they did not release any blockbuster titles in the quarter. In the quarter ending December 31, 2008, the company lost . On February 2, 2009, Ludlum Entertainment had inked a deal with Electronic Arts to grant exclusive rights to bring the work of Robert Ludlum into video gaming. As of early May 2009, the subsidiary studio EA Redwood Shores was known as Visceral Games. On June 24, 2009, EA announced it will merge two of its development studios, BioWare and Mythic into one single role-playing video game and MMO development powerhouse. The move will actually place Mythic under control of BioWare as Ray Muzyka and Greg Zeschuk will be in direct control of the new entity. By fall 2012, both Muzyka and Zeschuk had chosen to depart the merged entity in a joint retirement announcement.

On November 9, 2009, EA announced layoffs of 1,500 employees, representing 17% of its workforce, across a number of studios including EA Tiburon, Visceral Games, Mythic and EA Black Box. Also affected were "projects and support activities" that, according to Chief Financial Officer Eric Brown "don't make economic sense", resulting in the shutdown of popular communities such as Battlefield News and the EA Community Team. These layoffs also led to the complete shutdown of Pandemic Studios.

Chillingo published the popular Angry Birds for iOS and Cut the Rope for all platforms, but the deal did not include those properties, so Cut the Rope became published by ZeptoLab, and Angry Birds became published by Rovio Entertainment.

On May 4, 2011, EA reported $3.8 billion in revenues for the fiscal year ending March 2011, and on January 13, 2012, EA announced that it had exceeded $1 billion in digital revenue during the previous calendar year. In a note to employees, EA CEO John Riccitiello called this "an incredibly important milestone" for the company.

In June 2011, EA launched Origin, an online service to sell downloadable games for personal computers directly to consumers. Around this time, Valve, which runs Steam in direct competition with Origin, announced changes to storefront policy disallowing games that used in-game purchases that were not tied to Steam's purchasing process, and removed several of EA's games, including Crysis 2, Dragon Age II, and Alice: Madness Returns in 2012. Though EA released a new packaged version of Crysis 2 that including all the downloadable content without the storefront features, EA did not publish any additional games on Steam until 2019, instead selling all personal computer versions of games through Origin.

In July 2011, EA announced that it had acquired PopCap Games, the company behind games such as Plants vs. Zombies and Bejeweled. EA continued its shift toward digital goods in 2012, folding its mobile-focused EA Interactive (EAi) division "into other organizations throughout the company, specifically those divisions led by EA Labels president Frank Gibeau, COO Peter Moore, and CTO Rajat Taneja, and EVP of digital Kristian Segerstrale."

2013–present: Andrew Wilson era, Disney partnership, and monetization
On March 18, 2013, John Riccitiello announced that he would be stepping down as CEO and a member of the Board of Directors on March 30, 2013. Larry Probst was also appointed executive chairman on the same day. Andrew Wilson was named as the new CEO of EA by September 2013.

In April 2013, EA announced a reorganization which was to include dismissal of 10% of their workforce, consolidation of marketing functions which were distributed among the five label organizations, and subsumption of Origin operational leadership under the President of Labels.

EA acquired the lucrative exclusive license to develop games within the Star Wars universe from Disney in May 2013, shortly after Disney's closure of its internal LucasArts game development in 2013. EA secured its license from 2013 through 2023, and began to assign new Star Wars projects across several of its internal studios, including BioWare, DICE, Visceral Games, Motive Studios, Capital Games and external developer Respawn Entertainment.

In April 2015, EA announced that it would be shutting down various free-to-play games in July of that year, including Battlefield Heroes, Battlefield Play4Free, Need for Speed: World, and FIFA World.

The reorganization and revised marketing strategy lead to a gradual increase in stock value. In July 2015, Electronic Arts reached an all-time high with a stock value of US$71.63, surpassing the previous February 2005 record of $68.12. This is also up 54% from $46.57 in early January 2015. The surge was partly attributed to EA's then-highly anticipated Star Wars Battlefront reboot, which released one month before Star Wars: The Force Awakens, also highly anticipated.

During E3 2015, vice-president of the company, Patrick Söderlund, announced that the company will start investing more on smaller titles such as Unravel so as to broaden the company's portfolio. On December 10, 2015, EA announced a new division called Competitive Gaming Division, which focuses on creating competitive game experience and organizing ESports events. It was once headed by Peter Moore. In May 2016, Electronic Arts announced that they had formed a new internal division called Frostbite Labs. The new department specializes in creating new projects for virtual reality platforms, and "virtual humans". The new department is located in Stockholm and Vancouver.

EA announced the closure of Visceral Games in October 2017. Prior, Visceral had been supporting EA's other games but was also working on a Star Wars title named Project Ragtag since EA's acquisition of the Star Wars license, even hiring Amy Hennig to direct the project. While EA did not formally give a reason for the closure, industry pundits believed that EA was concerned about the principally single-player game which would be difficult to monetize, as well as the slow pace of development.

EA's original approach to the microtransactions in Star Wars Battlefront II sparked an industry-wide debate on the use of random-content loot boxes. While other games had used loot boxes, EA's original approach within Battlefront II from its early October 2017 launch included using such mechanics for pay to win gameplay elements, as well as locking various Star Wars characters behind expensive paywalls, leading several gaming journalists and players to complain. EA modified some of the costs of these elements in anticipation of the game's full November 2017 launch, but they were reportedly told by Disney to disable all microtransactions until they could come up with a fairer monetization scheme. Ultimately, by March 2018, EA had developed a fairer system that eliminated the pay to win elements and drastically reduced costs for unlocking characters. The controversy over Battlefront II loot boxes led to an 8.5% drop in stock value in one month—about $3.1 billion and impacted EA's financial results for the following quarters. Further, the visibility of this controversial led to debate at government levels around the world to determine if loot boxes were a form of gambling and if they should be regulated.

In January 2018, EA announced eMLS, a new competitive league for EA Sports' FIFA 18 through its Competitive Gaming Division (CGD) and MLS. That same month, EA teamed up with ESPN and Disney XD in a multi-year pact to broadcast Madden NFL competitive matches across the world through its Competitive Gaming Division arm.

On August 14, 2018, Patrick Söderlund announced his departure from EA as its vice-president and chief design officer, after serving twelve years with the company. With Söderlund's departure, the SEED group was moved as part of EA's studios, while the EA Originals and EA Partners teams were moved under the company's Strategic Growth group.

On February 6, 2019, Electronic Arts' stock value was hit by a decline of 13.3%, the worst decline since Halloween 2008. This was largely due to the marketing of their anticipated title Battlefield V, which was released after the holiday season of October 2018. Stocks were already declining since late August, when EA announced that Battlefield Vs release would be delayed until November. Upon release, the game was met with a mixed reception, and EA sold one million fewer copies than their expected figure of 7.3 million. Also attributed to the stock plunge was the game's lack of the game mode Battle Royale, popularized by PlayerUnknown's Battlegrounds and then Fortnite. Stocks then surged 9.6% with the surprise release of Apex Legends, which garnered 25 million players in just one week, smashing Fortnites record of 10 million players in two weeks. In advance of the end of its financial quarter ending March 31, 2019, Wilson announced they were cutting about 350 jobs, or about 4% of its workforce, primarily from their marketing, publishing, and operations divisions. Wilson stated the layoffs were necessary to "address our challenges and prepare for the opportunities ahead".

EA announced in October 2019 that it would be returning to release games on Steam, starting with the November 2019 release of Star Wars: Jedi Fallen Order, as well as bringing the EA Access subscription service to Steam. While EA plans to continue to sell games on Origin, the move to add Steam releases was to help get more consumers to see their offerings.

Due to COVID-19 lockdowns and growing demand for online games, EA's revenue grew to $1.4bn in the first quarter of 2020.

EA rebranded both EA Access and Origin to EA Play on August 18, 2020, but otherwise without changing the subscription price or services offered as part of a streamlining effort.

In December 2020, EA placed a bid to buy Codemasters, a British developer of racing games, in a deal worth $1.2 billion, outbidding an earlier offer placed by Take-Two Interactive. The acquisition, agreed to by Codemasters, was completed by February 18, 2021, with all shares of Codemasters transferred to Codex Games Limited, a subsidiary of EA. Wilson stated that "the franchises in our combined portfolio will enable us to create innovative new experiences and bring more players into the excitement of cars and motorsport".

In January 2021, Disney announced it had revived the Lucasfilm Games label for its licensed video game properties and announced new games including a new Star Wars game that would be developed by Ubisoft aimed for release in 2023, indicating that EA's ten-year exclusive license in 2013 to the Star Wars property was likely not extended. EA still maintained a non-exclusive license to Star Wars games, affirming more titles will be coming following this announcement.

After a six-year absence from producing college sports-based game due to legal issues related to student athlete likenesses with the NCAA, EA announced in February 2021 that it was returning to college sports with a planned EA Sports College Football title to likely be released in 2023.

The company announced its plans to extend its mobile commitment in February 2021 by acquiring Glu Mobile in an deal estimated worth . The acquisition was completed by the end of April 2021.

Former CEO and current chairman Probst stated in May 2021 he was retiring from the company. Current EA CEO Wilson took over as chairman.

In June 2021, EA confirmed that they had suffered a data breach, with game and engine source code taken from their servers, including the source for the Frostbite Engine and FIFA 21, though assuring no player or user data had been obtained. Hackers that had taken the code had started selling it around on the dark web. The perpetuators of this breach began to extort EA for money in July, releasing small portions of the data to public forums and threatening to release more if their demands were not met.

EA acquired mobile game developer Playdemic Studios in Manchester, England from Warner Bros. The acquisition is expected to complete by 2022.

In their SEC filings in September 2021, the company said that current CFO and COO Blake Jorgensen will be stepping down by mid-2022. The company's COO role will be taken over by Chief Studios Officer Laura Miele, while a search for a new CFO will be launched. Longtime Microsoft executive Chris Suh was later appointed as CFO in March 2022.

Industry reports around May 2022 asserted that EA had been looking to be acquired by larger media firms, including Disney, Apple, and Comcast/NBCUniversal. These reports said that EA had been nearing a final deal that would have had NBCUniversal spun out from Comcast before bringing EA within it. Amazon was also mentioned as a possible customer for EA, though CNBC reported in late August that Amazon is no longer interested in a takeover.

Games

Company structure 

EA is headed by CEO Andrew Wilson. All of the studios' group general managers from EA respond to Laura Miele, previous head of EA Worldwide Studios as Chief Studios Officer, and currently COO. One of the group general managers is Samantha Ryan who is Group General Manager for studios like BioWare, Motive Studio, Full Circle, Maxis and an unnamed studio in Seattle.

Development studios 
 BioWare in Edmonton, Canada; acquired in October 2007.
 BioWare Austin in Austin, Texas; acquired in October 2007.
 Codemasters in Southam, England; founded in October 1986, acquired by EA in February 2021.
 Codemasters Birmingham in Birmingham, England
 Codemasters Kuala Lumpur in Kuala Lumpur, Malaysia
 Codemasters India in Pune, India
 Slightly Mad Studios in London, England; founded in 2009, acquired by Codemasters in November 2019.
 Criterion Games in Guildford, England; acquired in August 2004.
 DICE in Stockholm, Sweden; acquired in October 2006.
 Frostbite Labs in Stockholm, Sweden and Vancouver, Canada; founded in May 2016.
 EA Baton Rouge in Baton Rouge, Louisiana; founded in September 2008.
EA Chillingo in Macclesfield, England; acquired in October 2010, reduced to bare staff in 2017 to primarily support mobile publishing.
EA Galway in Galway, Ireland.
 EA Gothenburg in Gothenburg, Sweden; founded in March 2011. From March 2011 to November 2012, the studio was named EA Gothenburg. From November 2012 to January 2020, the studio was named Ghost Games, until the original name came back.
 EA Mobile in Los Angeles, California; founded in 2004.
 EA Capital Games in Sacramento, California; acquired in 2011. From 2011 to 2014, the studio was named BioWare Sacramento.
 EA Redwood Studios in Redwood City, California; founded in 2016.
 Firemonkeys Studios in Melbourne, Australia; acquired in July 2012.
 Glu Mobile in San Francisco, California; acquired in April 2021.
 PlayFirst in Delaware; acquired by Glu in September 2014.
Playdemic in Manchester, England; acquired by EA in June 2021 from WarnerMedia
 Slingshot Games in Hyderabad, India.
 Tracktwenty Studios in Helsinki, Finland; founded in 2012.
EA Sports in Redwood Shores, California; founded in 1991.
 EA Cologne in Cologne, Germany
EA Madrid in Madrid, Spain; founded in October 2018.
EA Romania in Bucharest, Romania; acquired in 2006.
 EA Tiburon in Maitland, Florida; acquired in April 1998.
 EA Vancouver in Burnaby, Canada; acquired in 1991.
 Metalhead Software in Victoria, British Columbia; acquired in May 2021.
 Full Circle in Vancouver, Canada; opened in 2021.
 Maxis in Redwood City, California; acquired in July 1997.
 Maxis Texas in Austin, Texas was opened in 2019, working on a new IP
 Maxis Europe in multiple locations in Europe, was opened in 2021.
 Motive Studio in Montreal, Canada; founded in July 2015.
Motive Studio Vancouver in Burnaby, Canada; founded in June 2018.
 Pogo Studios in Redwood City, California; acquired in March 2001.
 Pogo Studios Shanghai in Shanghai, China.
 PopCap Games in Seattle, Washington; acquired in July 2011.
 PopCap Shanghai in Shanghai, China; acquired in July 2011.
 PopCap Hyderabad in Hyderabad, India; acquired in July 2011.
 Respawn Entertainment in Sherman Oaks, California; acquired in December 2017.
 Respawn Vancouver established in 2020 in Vancouver.
 Ridgeline Games in Seattle, Washington, led by Marcus Lehto former creative director of Bungie, founded in October 2021.
 Ripple Effect Studio in Los Angeles, California; established in May 2013, previously a subsidiary of DICE called DICE Los Angeles and a support studio before becoming its own company and being renamed in 2021. Some of the staff were originally from Danger Close Games.
 Spearhead in Seoul, South Korea; founded in 1998. From 1998 to July 2004, the studio was named EA Korea.
 Unnamed studio in Seattle, Washington, led by Kevin Stephens formerly vice-president of Monolith Productions, founded in May 2021.

Former 
 BioWare Montreal in Montreal, Canada; founded in March 2009, the studio merged into Motive Studio in August 2017.
BioWare San Francisco in San Francisco, California; founded as EA2D, the studio was renamed in August 2011 and closed in March 2013.
 Bullfrog Productions in Guildford, England; acquired in January 1995, the studio closed in 2001.
Danger Close Games in Los Angeles, California; acquired in February 2000, the studio closed in June 2013.
 EA Baltimore in Baltimore, Maryland; founded in 1998, the studio closed in 2002.
 EA Black Box in Burnaby, Canada; acquired in June 2002 as Black Box Games, later rebranded as EA Black Box. The studio closed in April 2013.
 EA Bright Light in Guildford, England; founded in 1995 as EA UK, the studio was renamed in 2008 and closed in October 2011.
 EA Chicago in Hoffman Estates, Illinois; founded in February 2004, the studio closed in November 2007.
 EA North Carolina in Morrisville, North Carolina; the studio closed in September 2013.
 EA Pacific in Irvine, California; the studio was acquired in August 1998 as Westwood Pacific, the studio was renamed in 2002 and closed in 2003.
 EA Phenomic in Ingelheim am Rhein, Germany; the studio was acquired in August 2006 and closed in July 2013.
 EA Salt Lake in Salt Lake City, Utah; the studio was acquired in December 2006 and closed in April 2017.
 EA Seattle in Seattle, Washington; the studio was acquired in January 1996 and closed in 2002.
 Easy Studios in Stockholm, Sweden; the studio was founded in 2008 and closed in March 2015.
 Codemasters Cheshire in Cheshire, England; merged with Criterion Games in May 2022.
 Firemint in Melbourne, Australia; the studio was acquired in May 2011 and merged with Iron Monkey Studios to become Firemonkeys Studios in July 2012.
Hypnotix in Little Falls, New Jersey; acquired in July 2005, the studio was merged into EA Tiburon.
 Iron Monkey Studios in Sydney, Australia; the studio was acquired in May 2011 and merged with Firemint to become Firemonkeys Studios in July 2012.
 Industrial Toys in Pasadena, California; acquired in July 2018, shut down in January 2023.
 Kesmai in Charlottesville, Virginia; the studio was acquired in 1999 and closed in 2001.
 Mythic Entertainment in Fairfax, Virginia; acquired in July 2006 as EA Mythic, the studio became Mythic Entertainment in July 2008, then BioWare Mythic in June 2009 and again Mythic Entertainment in 2012. The studio closed in May 2014.
 NuFX in Hoffman Estates, Illinois; the studio was acquired in February 2004 and closed in the same year.
 Origin Systems in Austin, Texas; the studio was acquired in September 1992 and closed in February 2004.
 Pandemic Studios in Los Angeles, California and Brisbane, Australia; the studio was acquired in October 2007 and closed in November 2009.
 Playfish in London, England; the studio was acquired in 2009 and closed in June 2013.
 Quicklime Games; closed in April 2013.
 Uprise in Uppsala, Sweden; founded as Uprise and acquired in 2012 as ESN. From 2014, the studio was named Uprise again. It merged into DICE Stockholm in 2019.
 Victory Games in Los Angeles, California; founded in February 2011 as BioWare Victory, the studio was renamed in November 2012 and closed in October 2013.
 Visceral Games in Redwood City, California; founded in 1998 as EA Redwood Shores, the studio was renamed in 2009 and closed in October 2017.
 Waystone Games in Los Angeles, California; the studio closed in November 2014.
 Westwood Studios in Las Vegas, Nevada; the studio was acquired in August 1998 and closed in March 2003.

Labels

EA Worldwide Studios 
Formerly EA Games, EA Worldwide Studios is home to many of EA's studios, which are responsible for action-adventure, role playing, racing and combat games marketed under the EA brand. In addition to traditional packaged-goods games, EA Worldwide Studios also develops massively multiplayer online role-playing games. As of April 2018, the division is led by Laura Miele.

EA Sports 

First introduced in 1991 as the Electronic Arts Sports Network, before being renamed due to a trademark dispute with ESPN, EA Sports publishes all the sports games from EA, including FIFA Football, Madden NFL, Fight Night, NBA Live, NCAA Football, Cricket, NCAA March Madness, Tiger Woods PGA Tour, NHL, NASCAR and Rugby.

EA All Play 
EA All Play is a mobile-oriented label that, since 2012, publishes digital titles like The Simpsons''', Tetris, and Battlefield, as well as Hasbro board games like Scrabble.

 EA Competitive Gaming Division 
The EA Competitive Gaming Division (CGD), founded in 2015 by Peter Moore and currently headed by Todd Sitrin, is the group dedicated on enabling global eSports competitions on EA's biggest franchises including FIFA, Madden NFL, Battlefield and more.

 SEED 
The Search for Extraordinary Experiences Division (SEED) was revealed at the 2017 Electronic Entertainment Expo as a technology research division and incubator, using tools like deep learning and neural networks to bring in player experiences and other external factors to help them develop more immersive narratives and games. SEED has offices in Los Angeles and Stockholm.

 Former labels 
 EA Kids — A label for educational titles. In January 1995, EA sold the label to and in conjunction with Capital Cities/ABC formed the independent ABC/EA Home Software, which was later absorbed into Creative Wonders in that year's May. In October 1997, EA and ABC sold Creative Wonders to The Learning Company for $40 million.
 EA Sports Big — A label used from 2000 to 2008 for arcade-styled extreme sports. 
 EA Sports Freestyle — A short-lived replacement for EA Sports Big used from 2008 to 2009, which focused exclusively on casual sports games, regardless of genre. The label was used for only three games before being retired.
 Electronic Arts Studios
 EA Games

Partnership and initiatives

EA Partners program (1997–present)
EA Partners co-publishing program was dedicated to publishing and distributing games developed by third-party developers. EA Partners began as EA Distribution, formed in 1997 and led by Tom Frisina, a former executive from Accolade and Three-Sixty who helped both companies find third-party developers as to provide publishing support for them. Frisina's early partners included Looking Glass Studios, MGM Interactive for the rights to the James Bond property, DreamWorks Interactive, and eventually DICE; in the latter two cases, these studios were acquired by EA as part of the EA DICE family. In 2003, EA's president John Riccitiello pushed for a renaming of the EA Distribution label, seeing the potential to bring in more independent developers and additional revenue streams. While they rebranded the label as EA Partners in 2003, Riccitiello left EA the following year, which disrupted the direction the label had been aiming to go.

Oddworld Inhabitants, who had signed on with EA Partner for their next Oddworld games, found the situation difficult as EA Partners was reluctant to support games where they did not own the intellectual property rights and instead favored internal development. The situation with EA Partners switched gears in 2005 after EA and Valve signed an EA Partners deal for the physical distribution of The Orange Box; EA Partners realized it needed to be flexible to handle the different publishing opportunities presented to them. A similar breakthrough was reached with signing on Harmonix for the distribution of the Rock Band games, requiring them to work closely with MTV Games on the plastic instrument controllers necessary for the titles. A number of major partnerships were made over the next few years, including Namco Bandai, Crytek, Starbreeze Studios, id Software, Epic Games and People Can Fly, Double Fine Productions, Grasshopper Manufacture, Spicy Horse, and Realtime Worlds. While many of these partnerships proved successful, the division had two major marks on its name. It was associated with the situation around Kingdoms of Amalur: Reckoning developed by 38 Studios, which had been significantly backed by loans from taxpayer funds from the state of Rhode Island. Kingdoms failed to be commercially successful, and EA Partners pulled out of making a sequel, leaving 38 Studios in default of its loan payback to the state. Secondly, while The Secret World from Funcom launched as a subscription game, Funcom had to switch their monetization model to free-to-play to improve their revenues, which further affected EA Partners.

Around April 2013, as part of a large 1000-employee layoff, many reporters claimed that EA Partners was also being shut down for its poor commercial performance, but the program remained active as the company refocused its efforts. The label remained dormant over the next several years, while Letts expanded on the EA Originals program, but following the move of EA Partners and EA Origins into the Strategic Growth group in August 2018, the label was revived on the March 2019 with a publishing deal with Velan Studios, formed from the former heads of Vicarious Visions.

Notable publishing/distribution agreements include:
 Alice: Madness Returns – Spicy Horse
 APB – Realtime Worlds
 Brütal Legend – Double Fine Productions
 Bulletstorm – Epic Games
 Crysis series – Crytek
 DeathSpank – Hothead Games
 Fuse – Insomniac Games
 Hellgate: London – Flagship Studios
 Kingdoms of Amalur: Reckoning – 38 Studios, Big Huge Games
 Rock Band series – Harmonix and MTV Games
 The Secret World – Funcom
 Shadows of the Damned – Grasshopper Manufacture
 Shank series – Klei Entertainment
 Syndicate – Starbreeze Studios
 Warp – Trapdoor

 EA Originals label (2017–present) 

EA Originals is a label within Electronic Arts own EA Partners program to help support independently developed video games. EA funds the money for development, and once it recoups that, all additional revenue goes to the partner studio that created the game. That studio also gets to keep the intellectual property rights for whatever it creates, and even has creative control over the project. The program was announced at EA's press event at the 2016 E3 Conference, and builds upon the success they had with Unravel from Coldwood Interactive in 2015. The first game to be supported under this program was Fe by Zoink, released in 2018. It was followed by A Way Out from Hazelight Studios, Unravel Two from Coldwood Interactive and Sea of Solitude from Jo-Mei Games.

In 2019, during its EA Play event, EA teased three new titles. Among the games featured were Lost in Random from Zoink and an unnamed title from Hazelight Studios. It was also announced that Glowmade would be entering the initiative with a title called RustHeart. In June 2020, Hazelight Studios' untitled project was revealed as It Takes Two'' and was released the following year.

In February 2023, Jeff Gamon, general manager of EA Partners, which oversees the Originals label, said the label will now invest on bigger games, although for those cases, the deal won't be as generous as the smaller games, for obvious reasons, as those are larger companies. Gamon said though, that the company still plans to release smaller and niche games and don't want to completely abandon its roots.

Criticism and controversies

Since the mid-2010s, Electronic Arts has been in the center of numerous controversies involving acquisitions of companies and alleged anti-consumerist practices in their individual games (which can be further read on their own articles), as well as lawsuits alleging EA's anti-competition when signing sports-related contracts.

Notes

References

Further reading

External links

 

 
1982 establishments in California
Companies based in Redwood City, California
Companies listed on the Nasdaq
Entertainment companies based in California
Golden Joystick Award winners
Macintosh software companies
Multinational companies headquartered in the United States
Public Investment Fund
Software companies based in the San Francisco Bay Area
Video game companies based in California
Video game companies established in 1982
Video game companies of the United States
Video game development companies
Video game publishers
Wargame companies